The Battle of Carrhae was fought in 53 BC between the Roman Republic and the Parthian Empire near the ancient town of Carrhae (present-day Harran, Turkey). An invading force of seven legions of Roman heavy infantry under Marcus Licinius Crassus was lured into the desert and decisively defeated by a mixed cavalry army of heavy cataphracts and light horse archers led by the Parthian general Surena. On such flat terrain, the Legion proved to have no viable tactics against the highly-mobile Parthian horsemen, and the slow and vulnerable Roman formations were surrounded, exhausted by constant attacks, and eventually crushed. Crassus was killed along with the majority of his army. It is commonly seen as one of the earliest and most important battles between the Roman and Parthian Empires and one of the most crushing defeats in Roman history. According to the poet Ovid in Book 6 of his poem Fasti, the battle occurred on the 9th day of June.

Crassus, a member of the First Triumvirate and the wealthiest man in Rome, had been enticed by the prospect of military glory and riches and decided to invade Parthia without the official consent of the Senate. Rejecting an offer from the Armenian King Artavasdes II to allow Crassus to invade Parthia via Armenia, Crassus marched his army directly through the deserts of Mesopotamia. His forces clashed with Surena's troops near Carrhae. Surena's cavalry killed or captured most of the Roman soldiers. Crassus himself was killed when truce negotiations turned violent.

His death ended the First Triumvirate. The following four-year period of peace between the remaining two members of the Triumvirate, Julius Caesar and Pompey, argues against the view that Crassus had been a peacekeeper within the group and supports the views of most Roman historians that friction between Crassus and Pompey had always been a greater cause of tension than that between Caesar and Pompey.

Background

Triumvirate 
The war in Parthia resulted from political arrangements intended to be mutually beneficial for Marcus Licinius Crassus, Pompeius Magnus, and Julius Caesar, the so-called First Triumvirate. In March and April 56 BC, meetings were held at Ravenna and Luca, in Caesar's province of Cisalpine Gaul, to reaffirm the weakening alliance formed four years earlier. It was agreed that the Triumvirate would marshal its supporters and resources to secure legislation for prolonging Caesar's Gallic command and to influence the upcoming elections for 55 BC, with the objective of a second joint consulship for Crassus and Pompeius. The Triumvirate aimed to expand their faction's power by traditional means: military commands, placing political allies in office and advancing legislation to promote their interests. Pressure in various forms was brought to bear on the elections: money, influence from patronage and friendship and the force of 1000 troopers brought from Gaul by Crassus's son Publius. The faction secured the consulship and most of the other offices that were sought. Legislation passed by the tribune Trebonius (the Lex Trebonia) granted extended proconsulships of five years, matching that of Caesar in Gaul, to the two outgoing consuls. The Spanish provinces would go to Pompeius. Crassus arranged to have Syria with the transparent intention of going to war with Parthia.

Developments in Parthia 
Meanwhile, in Parthia, a war of succession had broken out in 57 BC after King Phraates III had been killed by his sons Orodes II and Mithridates IV, who then began fighting each other over the throne. In the first stage, Orodes emerged victorious and appointed his brother as king of Media (his de facto governor) as a compromise. However, another armed clash made Orodes force Mithridates to flee to Aulus Gabinius, the Roman proconsul of Syria. Gabinius sought to interfere in the succession dispute on behalf of Mithridates so that Rome could make him its puppet king and seize control of Parthia in the process. However, Gabinius abandoned his plans and opted to intervene in Ptolemaic Egyptian affairs instead.

Mithridates proceeded to invade Babylonia on his own with some initial success but was soon confronted by the army of the Parthian commander Surena.

Gabinius's successor, Crassus, also sought to ally himself with Mithridates and invaded Parthia's client-state Osroene in 54 BC but wasted most of his time in waiting for reinforcements on the Balikh River's left bank while Surena besieged, defeated and executed Mithridates in Seleucia on the Tigris. Orodes, now unopposed in his own realm, marched north to invade Rome's ally Armenia, where King Artavasdes II soon defected to the Parthian side.

Crassus's preparations 

The notoriously wealthy Marcus Crassus was around 62 when he embarked on the Parthian invasion. Greed is often regarded by the ancient sources, particularly his biographer Plutarch, as his major character fault and his motive for going to war. The historian Erich S. Gruen believed that Crassus's purpose was to enrich the public treasury since personal wealth was not what Crassus most lacked. Most modern historians tend to view insatiable greed, envy of Pompey's military exploits and rivalry as his motivations since his long-faded military reputation had always been inferior to that of Pompeius and, after five years of war in Gaul, to that of Caesar. His major military achievements had been the defeat of Spartacus in 71 BC and his victory at the Battle of the Colline Gate for Sulla a decade earlier. Plutarch noted that Caesar wrote to Crassus from Gaul and endorsed the plan to invade Parthia, an indication that he regarded Crassus's military campaign as complementary and not merely rivalrous to his own.

Another factor in Crassus's decision to invade Parthia was the expected ease of the campaign. The Roman legions had easily crushed the numerically superior armies of other eastern powers such as Pontus and Armenia, and Crassus expected Parthia to be an easy target.

Cicero, however, suggested an additional factor: the ambitions of Marcus's son, the talented Publius Crassus, who had commanded successful campaigns in Gaul under Caesar. Upon his return to Rome as a highly decorated officer, Publius took steps to establish his own political career. Roman sources view the Battle of Carrhae not only as a calamity for Rome and a disgrace for Marcus Crassus but also as a tragedy that cut short Publius Crassus's promising career.

Some Romans objected to the war against Parthia. Cicero calls it a war nulla causa ("with no justification") on the grounds that Parthia had a treaty with Rome. The tribune Ateius Capito put up strenuous opposition and infamously conducted a public ritual of execration as Crassus prepared to depart.

Despite protests and dire omens, Marcus Crassus left Rome on November 14, 55 BC. Publius Crassus joined him in Syria during the winter of 54–53 BC and brought with him the thousand Celtic cavalry troopers from Gaul who remained loyal to their young leader until their death.

Invasion of Parthia

Crassus arrived in Syria in late 55 BC and immediately set about using his immense wealth to raise an army. According to Plutarch, he assembled a force of seven legions for a total of about 28,000 to 35,000 heavy infantry. He also had about 4,000 light infantry, and 4,000 cavalry, including the 1000-strong Gallic cavalry that Publius had brought with him. With the aid of Hellenic settlements in Syria and the support of about 6,000 cavalry from Artavasdes, the Armenian king, Crassus marched on Parthia. Artavasdes advised him to take a route through Armenia to avoid the desert and offered him reinforcements of a further 10,000 cavalry and 30,000 infantry.

Crassus refused the offer and decided to take the direct route through Mesopotamia and to capture the great cities in the region. In response, the Parthian king, divided his army and took most of the soldiers, mainly foot archers with a small amount of cavalry, to punish the Armenians himself. He sent the rest of his forces, an all-cavalry force under the command of spahbod Surena, to scout out and harass Crassus's army. Orodes did not anticipate that Surena's heavily outnumbered force would be able to defeat Crassus and merely wanted to delay him. Plutarch described Surena's force as "a thousand mail-clad horsemen and a still greater number of light-armed cavalry". Including slaves and vassals, Surena's expedition numbered ten thousand in total, supported by a baggage train of one thousand camels.Plutarch, Life of Crassus, 21: "Nor was Surena an ordinary man at all, but in wealth, birth, and consideration, he stood next the king, while in valour and ability he was the foremost Parthian of his time, besides having no equal in stature and personal beauty. He used to travel on private business with a baggage train of a thousand camels, and was followed by two hundred waggons for his concubines, while a thousand mail-clad horsemen and a still greater number of light-armed cavalry served as his escort; and had altogether, as horsemen, vassals, and slaves, no fewer than ten thousand men."

Crassus received directions from the Osroene chieftain Ariamnes, who had assisted Pompey in his eastern campaigns. Crassus trusted Ariamnes, who, however, was in the pay of the Parthians. He urged Crassus to attack at once and falsely stated that the Parthians were weak and disorganized. He then led Crassus's army into the most desolate part of the desert, far from any water. Crassus then received a message from Artavasdes that claimed that the main Parthian army was in Armenia, and the letter begged him for help. Crassus ignored the message and continued his advance into Mesopotamia. He encountered Surena's army near the town of Carrhae.

Battle 

After being informed of the presence of the Parthian army (which numbered roughly 10,000), Crassus's army panicked. Crassus' commanding general, Cassius, recommended that the army be deployed in the traditional Roman fashion, with infantry forming the centre and cavalry on the wings. At first, Crassus agreed, but he soon changed his mind and redeployed his men into a hollow square, each side formed by twelve cohorts. That formation would protect his forces from being outflanked but at the cost of mobility. The Roman forces advanced and came to a stream. Crassus's generals advised him to make camp and to attack the next morning to give his men a chance to rest. Publius, however, was eager to fight and managed to convince Crassus to confront the Parthians immediately.

The Parthians went to great lengths to intimidate the Romans. Firstly, they beat a great number of hollow drums and the Roman troops were unsettled by the loud and cacophonous noise. Surena then ordered his cataphracts to cover their armour in cloths and advance. When they were within sight of the Romans, they simultaneously dropped the cloths and revealed their shining armour. The sight was designed to intimidate the Romans.

Though Surena had originally planned to shatter the Roman lines with a charge by his cataphracts, he judged that it would not yet be enough to break them. Thus, he sent his horse archers to surround the Roman square. Crassus sent his skirmishers to drive the horse archers off, but they were driven back by the latter's arrows. The horse archers then engaged the legionaries. The legionaries were protected by their large shields (scuta) and armour, but they could not cover the entire body. Some historians describe the arrows partially penetrating the Roman shields and nailing the shields to the limbs of the Roman infantry and nailing their feet to the ground. However, Plutarch wrote in his accounts that the Romans were met with a shower of arrows that passed through every kind of cover, hard and soft alike. Other historians state that most wounds inflicted were nonfatal hits to exposed limbs.

The Romans repeatedly advanced towards the Parthians to attempt to engage in close-quarters fighting, but the horse archers were always able to retreat safely and loosed Parthian shots as they withdrew. The legionaries then formed the testudo formation by locking their shields together to present a nearly-impenetrable front to missiles. However, that formation severely restricted their ability in melee combat. The Parthian cataphracts exploited that weakness and repeatedly charged the Roman line, which caused panic and inflicted heavy casualties. When the Romans tried to loosen their formation to repel the cataphracts, the latter rapidly retreated, and the horse archers resumed shooting at the legionaries, who were now more exposed.

Crassus now hoped that his legionaries could hold out until the Parthians ran out of arrows. However, Surena used thousands of camels to resupply his horse archers. Upon this realisation, Crassus dispatched his son Publius with 1,300 Gallic cavalry, 500 archers and eight cohorts of legionaries to drive off the horse archers. The horse archers feigned retreat and drew off Publius' force, which suffered heavy casualties from arrow fire.

Once Publius and his men were sufficiently separated from the rest of the army, the Parthian cataphracts confronted them while the horse archers cut off their retreat. In the ensuing combat, the Gauls fought bravely, but their inferiority in weapons and armor was evident. They eventually retreated to a hill, where Publius committed suicide while the rest of his men were slaughtered, with only 500 being taken alive.

Crassus, unaware of his son's fate but realising that Publius was in danger, ordered a general advance. He was confronted with the sight of his son's head on a spear. The Parthian horse archers began to surround the Roman infantry and shot at them from all directions. Meanwhile, the cataphracts mounted a series of charges that disorganised the Romans.

The Parthian onslaught did not cease until nightfall. Crassus, deeply shaken by his son's death, ordered a retreat to the nearby town of Carrhae and left behind 4000 wounded, who were killed by the Parthians the next morning.

Four Roman cohorts got lost in the dark and were surrounded on a hill by the Parthians, with only 20 Romans surviving.

The next day, Surena sent a message to the Romans and offered to negotiate with Crassus. Surena proposed a truce to allow the Roman army to return to Syria safely in exchange for Rome giving up all territory east of the Euphrates. Surena either sent an embassy to the Romans by the hills or went himself to state he wanted a peace conference on an evacuation.

Crassus was reluctant to meet with the Parthians, but his troops threatened to mutiny otherwise. At the meeting, a Parthian pulled at Crassus's reins and sparked violence in which Crassus and his generals were killed.

After his death, the Parthians allegedly poured molten gold down his throat in a symbolic gesture mocking Crassus's renowned greed. Plutarch reports that Crassus' severed head was then used as a prop for part of a play, Euripides' Bacchae, performed at a banquet before the king.  The remaining Romans at Carrhae attempted to flee, but most were captured or killed. According to the ancient historian Plutarch, Roman casualties amounted to about 20,000 killed and 10,000 captured, which made the battle one of the costliest defeats in Roman history. Parthian casualties were minimal.

Aftermath 

Rome was humiliated by this defeat, which was made even worse by the fact that the Parthians had captured several Legionary Eagles. It is also mentioned by Plutarch that the Parthians found the Roman prisoner-of-war who most resembled Crassus, dressed him as a woman, and paraded him through Parthia for all to see. This was a direct attack on Roman military culture, as the Parthians ordered the other Roman prisoners to hail this false Crassus as Imperator while on parade, a direct mockery of a Roman triumph. 

, with the rest of the Parthian Army, defeated the Armenians and captured their country. However, Surena's victory invoked the jealousy of the Parthian king, who ordered Surena's execution. Following Surena's death,  himself took command of the Parthian army and led an unsuccessful military campaign into Syria.

The Battle of Carrhae was one of the first major battles between the Romans and Parthians. It was the victory that led Parthia to invade Syria and Armenia several times, with varying successes. Rome also realised that its legionaries could not effectively fight against Parthian cavalry.

Gaius Cassius Longinus, a quaestor under Crassus, led approximately 10,000 surviving soldiers from the battlefield back to Syria, where he governed as a proquaestor for two years, defending Syria from 's further attacks. He received praise from Cicero for his victory. Cassius later played a key role in the conspiracy to assassinate Julius Caesar in 44 BC.

The 10,000 Roman prisoners of war appear to have been deported to Alexandria Margiana (Merv) near the Parthian Empire's northeastern border in 53 BC, where they reportedly married to local people. It has been hypothesized that some of them founded the Chinese city of Liqian after they had become soldiers for the Xiongnu during the Battle of Zhizhi against the Han dynasty, but that is disputed.

Legacy 
 

The capture of the golden aquilae (legionary battle standards) by the Parthians was considered a grave moral defeat and evil omen for the Romans. When he was assassinated, Caesar was planning a retaliatory war. It was said that there would have been harsh retribution if Caesar won because the surviving son of Crassus would be among the Roman forces.

However, the fall of the Roman Republic intervened, and the beginning of imperial monarchy at Rome followed. Sulla's first march on Rome in 88 BC had begun the collapse of the republican form of government, but the death of Crassus and the loss of his legions utterly reconfigured the balance of power at Rome.  An old theory ran that the death of Crassus, along with the death of Julia in 54, Pompey's wife and Caesar's daughter, may have severed the ties between Caesar and Pompey, and the First Triumvirate no longer existed. As a result, civil war broke out. Caesar won, and the Republic quickly became an autocratic dictatorship.

Several historians note the lapse of time between Crassus's death and the outbreak of civil war. Gaius Stern has claimed that the death nearly cut the links the First Triumvirate enjoyed with the blue-blooded aristocracy, leaving the entire state vulnerable to the friction that eventually turned into civil war. Thus, an immediate effect of the battle may have been the elimination of certain private checks and balances (such as Crassus's relationship to Metellus Pius Scipio) that had kept a lid on political tensions.

In a regional context, however, the battle had little negative impact for Rome in the long-term as the following retaliatory invasion of Rome by Parthia in 40 BC was stopped and repulsed by Publius Ventidius Bassus, it did not prevent an invasion of Parthia by Mark Anthony in 36 BC (although this campaign ended in failure as well).

It is rumoured that some of the survivors of Crassus's army ended up in China. In the 1940s, Homer H. Dubs, an American professor of Chinese history at the University of Oxford, suggested that the people of Liqian were descended from Roman soldiers taken prisoner after the battle. The prisoners, Dubs proposed, were resettled by the Parthians on their eastern border and may have fought as mercenaries at the Battle of Zhizhi between the Chinese and the Xiongnu in 36 BC. Chinese chroniclers mention the use of a "fish-scale formation" of soldiers as well as a double wooden palisade structure, which Dubs believed referred to the testudo formation and a defensive tactic that was unique to the Romans. To date, no artifacts that might confirm a Roman presence, such as coins or weaponry, have been discovered in Zhelaizhai, and Dubs' theories have not been accepted by the vast majority of historians.

Rob Gifford, commenting on the theory, described it as one of many "rural myths".  Alfred Duggan used the possible fate of the Roman prisoners as the kernel of his novel Winter Quarters, which suggested that they were employed as frontier guards on the eastern border of the Parthian Empire.

Notes

References

Sources

Further reading
 A.D.H. Bivar, "The Campaign of Carrhae", in The Cambridge History of Iran (Cambridge University Press, 1983) vol. 3, pp. 48–56, limited preview online.
 
 Martin Sicker, "Carrhae", in The Pre-Islamic Middle East (Greenwood Publishing Group, 2000), pp. 149–51 online.
 
 Philip Sidnell, Warhorse: Cavalry in Ancient Warfare (Continuum, 2006), pp. 237–42, detailed discussion of the battle from a cavalry perspective, limited preview online.

External links 
The only two ancient records of the battle:
 Plutarch's Life of Crassus, 23–27 (Online)
 Cassius Dio's Roman History, 40:21–24 (Online)

Other related sites:
 Battle of Carrhae  at Livius.org
 Battle of Carrhae at HistoryNet
 Battle of Carrhae, 53 BC at Gates of Nineveh

1st century BC in Iran
1st century BC in the Roman Republic
1st century BC
1st-century BC battles
Carrhae
53 BC
Carrhae
Carrhae
Carrhae
History of Şanlıurfa Province
Harran